Zamfireşti may refer to several villages in Romania:

 Zamfireşti, a village in Cepari Commune, Argeș County
 Zamfireşti, a village in Cotmeana Commune, Argeș County
 Zamfireşti, a village in Galbenu Commune, Brăila County

See also 
 Zamfir
 Zamfirescu (surname)